The 2007 USA Cycling Professional Tour is the inaugural year of a professional road bicycle racing series organized by USA Cycling.

Levi Leipheimer and the  team won the overall individual and team titles respectively. Leipheimer finished the season with 381 points over teammate George Hincapie, Germany’s Bernhard Eisel, Juan José Haedo of Argentina and Slovenia’s Janez Brajkovič.

Events 
The 2007 USA Cycling Professional Tour consists of the following 15 one-day races and stage races:

See also 
 2007 USA Cycling National Racing Calendar

References 

USA Cycling Professional Tour, 2007
USA Cycling Professional Tour, 2007
USA